Zul Yusri Che Harun (born 24 June 1986 in Pasir Mas, Kelantan) is a Malaysian footballer who plays as a midfielder formerly playing for  Kelantan FA in Malaysia Super League.

References

External links
 Forum Kelate.net
 

1986 births
Living people
Malaysian footballers
Kelantan FA players
People from Kelantan
Malaysian people of Malay descent
Association football midfielders